Gert Verheyen (born 20 September 1970) is a Belgian retired footballer and manager, who was last in charge of Oostende. 

In a 20-year professional career, he was mainly associated with Anderlecht and Club Brugge (especially the latter), scoring over 200 official goals for both clubs combined; he was known to have rather few technical skills, relying on a hard-working approach.

Verheyen represented Belgium in two World Cups and one European Championship. His father Jan was also player and international for Belgium from 1965 till 1976.

Club career
Born in Hoogstraten, Antwerp, Verheyen started playing professionally with Lierse SK, scoring ten Belgian Second Division goals in his two season-spell, as he was not yet aged 18. In the 1988 summer he moved to R.S.C. Anderlecht, where he did not have a good scoring record, also appearing rarely in his first two years.

In 1992, Verheyen signed with Club Brugge KV, where he would remain for the next 14 years, rarely missing a game and netting in double digits in ten of those campaigns, with the side collecting four leagues and two cups. In October 2000 he was expected to move to England with Ipswich Town, but the deal eventually fell through.

After more than 500 overall appearances for Brugge (with 195 goals), Verheyen retired on 5 May 2006, becoming a reserve team trainer at the club in 2006–07 and quitting football subsequently at the season's end.

International career
Verheyen earned exactly 50 caps for the Belgium national team during eight years, scoring ten times. He was selected for the 1998 and 2002 FIFA World Cups as well as UEFA Euro 2000, the latter played on home soil.

Verheyen's was controversially sent off at the 1998 World Cup in France, as the Red Devils led 2–0 against Mexico. The foul resulted in a penalty, and the match ended a 2–2 draw; despite the incident, he continued to be a regular in the next few years.

Honours

Player 
Anderlecht
 Belgian First Division: 1990–91
 Belgian Cup: 1988–89
 European Cup Winners' Cup: runners-up 1989–90
Bruges Matins: 1988

Club Brugge

 Belgian First Division: 1995–96, 1997–98, 2002–03, 2004–05
 Belgian Cup: 1994–95, 1995–96, 2001–02, 2003–04; runners-up: 1997–98, 2004–05
 Belgian Supercup: 1992, 1994, 1996, 1998, 2002, 2003, 2004, 2005
 Bruges Matins: 1992, 1993, 1995, 1996, 1998, 2000, 2001, 2004, 2006
 Jules Pappaert Cup: 1995, 2005

Belgium
 FIFA Fair Play Trophy: 2002 World Cup

References

External links
 Club Brugge archives 
 
 Official fansite 
 

1970 births
Living people
People from Hoogstraten
Footballers from Antwerp Province
Belgian footballers
Association football forwards
Belgian Pro League players
Challenger Pro League players
Lierse S.K. players
R.S.C. Anderlecht players
Club Brugge KV players
Belgium international footballers
1998 FIFA World Cup players
2002 FIFA World Cup players
UEFA Euro 2000 players
Belgian football managers
K.V. Oostende managers
Club Brugge KV non-playing staff
Hoogstraten VV players